Sabrine Mamay (born 17 February 1991) is a Tunisian footballer who plays as a midfielder for Emirati side Al Ain Club and the Tunisia women's national team.

Club career
Mamay played in Canada for Quebec City Amiral in 2012, in the United Arab Emirates for Abu Dhabi Country Club between 2014 and 2016, and in Lebanon for ÓBerytus in 2017. She left Lebanon following disagreements and mistreatment by the head coach.

She then played for Al Ain in the United Arab Emirates.

International career
Mamay has represented Tunisia internationally at senior level since 2006; she played for them during the 2008 African Women's Championship.

Career statistics

International goals
Scores and results list Tunisia goal tally first

Scores and results list United Arab Emirates goal tally first

See also
 List of Tunisia women's international footballers

References

External links
 
 

1991 births
Living people
Tunisian women's footballers
Emirati women's footballers
Tunisian emigrants to the United Arab Emirates
Naturalized citizens of the United Arab Emirates
Women's association football midfielders
Abu Dhabi Country Club players
ÓBerytus players
Al Ain FC (women) players
Lebanese Women's Football League players
Tunisia women's international footballers
United Arab Emirates women's international footballers
Dual internationalists (women's football)
Tunisian expatriate footballers
Tunisian expatriates in Canada
Expatriate women's soccer players in Canada
Tunisian expatriate sportspeople in Lebanon
Emirati expatriate footballers
Emirati expatriate sportspeople in Lebanon
Expatriate women's footballers in Lebanon
Dynamo de Quebec players